Abyssopedunculus is a genus of trematodes in the family Opecoelidae. It consists of one species, Abyssopedunculus brevis (Andres & Overstreet, 2013) Martin, Huston, Cutmore & Cribb, 2018.

References

Opecoelidae
Plagiorchiida genera